YZR may refer to:

 Sarnia Chris Hadfield Airport, Canada (IATA Code)
 Yangtze River Express Airlines, China (ICAO Code)